Dr. Khalid Zaffar Masoodi was born at Narwara near Iddgah in Srinagar, J&K, India in April 1979. His father was a renowned doctor and educator.

Education
From the age of 3 to 15 Khalid Z. Masoodi went to Burn Hall School, Srinagar. In 1996 Masoodi went to Aligarh Muslim University where he obtained his +2 and BSc (Botany Hons) in 2002.

In 2002 Department of Biotechnology, Govt. of India selected Khalid Z. Masoodi for Merit Scholarship to pursue MSc in Biotechnology from Jammu University through National level exam where he derived the mechanism of gene amplification in Plantago lagopus (Mediterranean Plantain ). In 2006 after qualifying, CSIR-NET and GATE and securing 25th all India rank in DBT-BET-JRF He joined PhD under the supervision of Prof. Manoj K. Dhar a renowned Cytogeneticist and Biotechnologist of India. He discovered two new genes from Purple Black carrot and reconstructed carrot carotenoid biosynthetic pathways in E. coli using Gene Amplification technology (GAT) and completed his PhD in Plant Biotechnology in 2010.

Career
For his work on GAT he was offered a position as a Postdoc in Prof. Zhou Wang's Lab, University of Pittsburgh, Pennsylvania, USA from June 2010 till May 2014 where he worked on Drug Discovery and Gene Discovery against Prostate Cancer. At University of Pittsburgh he worked on multiple projects simultaneously being an expert in Biotechnology-an interdisciplinary subject. In Dec 2014 Khalid Z. Masoodi joined as Assistant professor of Plant Biotechnology at SKUAST-Kashmir, Shalimar, J&K, India. 
He published his first scientific paper in 2013 (.) where he used animal model to increase the efficacy of Intermittent Androgen deprivation therapy for prostate cancer patients.
 
From 2010-2015 The focus of his research was extensively on 3 aspects of Drug discovery and gene discovery against Prostate cancer.
	Modifying old therapies for Prostate cancer
	Drug discovery for treating Prostate cancer using small molecule inhibitors (nanoparticles)
	Gene discovery for prostate cancer that can act as new targets for different therapies.
i.	Androgen deprivation therapy (ADT) is the standard treatment for patients with prostate-specific antigen progression after treatment for localized prostate cancer. An alternative to continuous ADT is intermittent ADT (IADT), which allows recovery of testosterone during off-cycles to stimulate regrowth and differentiation of the regressed prostate tumor. His findings suggest that short off-cycle coupled with 5ɑ-reductase inhibition could maximize suppression of prostate tumor growth and, thus improve potential survival benefit achieved in combination with IADT. He found out that the efficacy of IADT can be improved by finasteride or dutasteride administration when short fixed off-cycle intervals are used. Further extrapolating this study in mice he found out that 5α-reductase inhibition in shorter off-cycles of testosterone recovery could maximize tumor growth inhibition during IADT and perhaps increase survival. This finding can be used to help design future clinical trials testing whether 5ARI coupled with short off-cycles can prolong the survival of prostate cancer patients on IADT. For his work Dr. Khalid Masoodi was conferred with Travel Award by the Society of Basic Urology Research (SBUR, USA) for the SBUR 2012 SBUR Fall Symposium held on 15–18 November 2012 at the Trump International Beach Resort in Miami, Florida, USA.
ii.	

Dr. Khalid Z. Masoodi helped in discovering the role of Four major genes that have a role in prostate cancer progression. The data suggested that DHX15 enhances AR transcriptional activity and contributes to PCa progression through Siah2 mediated ubiquitination of androgen receptor. Another gene Prp8 was shown to be a novel AR cofactor that interacts with NES(AR) and regulates AR function in prostate cancer cells. The study suggested that PABPC1 another candidate is an important AR co-regulator capable of promoting AR nuclear localization and function via interaction with the NTD region. Elevated expression of PABPC1 in prostate cancer specimens is likely to play an important role in prostate carcinogenesis by enhancing AR signalling pathways. Elongation factor, RNA polymerase II, 2 (ELL2) and its pathway genes were shown to play an important role in the development and progression of prostate cancer. For this finding he was conferred with Journal Award for publishing best paper in Endocrinology by Society of Endocrinology, Glasgow, United Kingdom on 19 Nov 2018.
iii.	

He and his co-workers described high-throughput high-content screening (HCS) campaign to identify small-molecule inhibitors of AR nuclear localization in the C4-2 CRPC cell line stably transfected with GFP-AR. The implementation of this HCS assay to screen a library of 219,055 compounds led to the discovery of 3 small molecules capable of inhibiting AR nuclear localization and function in C4-2 cells, demonstrating the feasibility of using this cell-based phenotypic assay to identify small molecules targeting the subcellular localization of AR.

In 2018, he published four pivotal scientific works, which would revolutionise modern biotechnology and cancer research. He discovered three new Synthetic Small Molecules and two Plant based molecules against Prostate cancer,
Furthermore, the three hit compounds provide opportunities to develop novel AR drugs with potential for therapeutic intervention in CRPC patients who have relapsed after treatment with anti-androgens, such as abiraterone and/or enzalutamide. These findings suggest that EPPI, CPPI and IMTPPE the three new small molecules could serve as lead structures for the development of therapeutic agents for CRPC including those resistant to enzalutamide. His achievement was highlighted in national Media.
By 2020 he had over 43 peer reviewed publications and had filed 5 patent application with Indian Patent office, 2 books and over 200 new gene sequences in genbank (www.ncbi.nih.nlm.gov).

After joining Sher-e-Kashmir University of Agricultural Sciences and technology of Kashmir he continued working in collaboration with University of Pittsburgh apart from venturing into Agricultural Sciences being a PhD in Plant Biotechnology. He started working on medicinal plants and various biotic and abiotic stress in agriculture/horticulture crops. The Himalayan region of J&K being a rich repertoire of around 3054 medicinal and aromatic plant species (MAPs) that are endogenous to Kashmir valley and were not explored for anticancer properties against prostate cancer through Transcriptomics. He consolidated 150 Medicinal plants in form of the first book he published. SERB-DST, Govt of India awarded him Early career research Award in 2016 in form of research grant of 49 lacs to carry out drug discovery against Prostate cancer. In this drug discovery program against Prostate cancer he successfully created SKUAST-K Innovative Centre for drug Discovery Library (SKICDDL) where 20,000 Plant Based bioactive differential extracts were screened against Prostate cancer for effectively abrogating the nuclear localization of GFP tagged AR and GFP tagged Hif1α in C4-2 cells using fluorescence microscopy. The implementation of this assay led to the discovery of 16 extracts from different medicinal plants capable of inhibiting AR nuclear localization and function in C4-2 cells. Further testing of these 16 molecules on PI3Kinase pathway genes implemented that 6 extracts in these 16 extracts can inhibit PI3 Kinase pathway as well thus targeting the cancer cells more effectively. Two of the extracts were tested in human xenograft C4-2/Relapsed LNCaP human xenograft model and found effective in inhibiting growth of tumors and doubled the survival of nude mice bearing tumors. (Three Patents were filed from this SERB-DST-ECRA Grant) . 
Simultaneously at SKUAST-Kashmir he started working on Cold tolerance in tomato and Biotic stress like Apple Scab and Chili wilt. He conducted a thorough study on Apple scab pathogen from all regions of J&K for the first time. While working on Scab he deciphered the whole transcriptome of Apple of endogenous varieties for the first time (GEO, NCBI.nlm.nih.gov). Apart from this he discovered 16 new transcription factors that have role in imparting scab resistance.

References 

1979 births
Indian scientists
Living people
Aligarh Muslim University alumni
People from Srinagar